Poland - The Warsaw Concert  is the twenty-fourth major release and fifth live album by Tangerine Dream. It spent one week on the UK Albums Chart at number 90.

Track listing

"Tangent" contains a hidden track at the end, an encore titled "Rare Bird", which is not listed on the sleeve of any of the original 1984 issues. On some CD reissues, it is separated and listed as its own track.

The four tracks consist of 3-4 distinct sections each. The third of the four sections of "Tangent" is titled "Polish Dance" (which is notably similar to the composition "Choronzon" from Exit, played backwards). The second section of "Barbakane" is titled "Warsaw in the Sun", which was remixed and released as a single, with "Polish Dance" unaltered on the b-side.

"Barbakane" was shortened to 13:52 on most CD reissues, in order to fit the 80-minute time restraint of the CD, and to avoid having to issue a double disc version.

Out of twelve CD releases, only three issues have the complete album:
 (1984) Jive/Teldec 8.28638
 (1984) Relativity 88561-8045-2, re-released in 1993
 (2011) Reactive EREACD 2018

All other issues have the truncated version of "Barbakane". Some releases remove "Tangent" altogether.

It was also available as a limited edition picture disc which feature the cover photos directly on the vinyl.

Personnel
 Edgar Froese
 Christopher Franke
 Johannes Schmoelling

Equipment
The following equipment were used on this live recording:

Chris Franke

 Sequential Circuits Prophet-5
 Sequential Circuits Prophet 600
 Sequential Circuits Pro-1
 E-mu Emulator
 E-mu Custom Programmable Synth
 Moog Custom Programmable Modular Synth
 MTI Synergy
 PE Polyrhythmic Sequencer
 Compulab Digital Sequencer
 Syntec Custom Digital Drum Computer
 Simmons Drum Modules
 Quantec Room Simulator
 Roland SDE 3000
 Hill Multi-Mixer

Edgar Froese

 Yamaha DX7
 Yamaha YP-30
 Roland Jupiter-8
 Roland Jupiter-6
 Sequential Circuits Prophet-5
 PPG Wave 2.2
 PE Polyrhythmic Sequencer
 Publison DHM 89 B2
 Publison KB 2000
 Korg SDD 3000 Delay
 Roland SDE MIDI/DCB Interfaces
 Quantec Room Simulator
 Canproduct Mixer

Johannes Schmoelling

 Roland Jupiter-8
 PPG Wave 2.3 Waveterm
 EEH CM 4 Digital Sequencer
 Dr. Böhm Digital Drums
 Roland TR-808
 Mini Moog
 Korg Mono/Poly
 Roland SDE 3000 Delay
 Canproduct Mixer
 MXR 01 Digital Reverb
 MXR Digital Delay
 BOSS Overdrive/Flanger

Singles
 "Warsaw in the Sun" b/w "Polish Dance" (UK no. 96)

References

1984 live albums
Tangerine Dream live albums
Jive Records live albums